Scroll is a web service developed by Scroll Labs Inc. that offers ad-free access to websites in exchange for a subscription fee. Scroll is not an ad blocker, but rather partners directly with internet publishers who voluntarily take down ads on their site for Scroll users in exchange for a portion of the subscription fee.

In May 2021, Scroll was acquired by Twitter.

Functionality
Scroll enables users to browse websites partnered with Scroll without the display of online advertisements in exchange for paying a contribution fee. Scroll does not work as an ad blocker, which disables advertisements without compensation to the publisher; instead, it sets a browser cookie indicating that the user is a Scroll subscriber, and Scroll software incorporated into the website detects the cookie and serves an ad-free version of the site. In exchange for disabling advertisements, partner websites receive a portion of the subscription fee. As of January 2020, Scroll keeps 30% of the subscription fee and the rest is distributed among publisher sites. Payments to sites are made individually by user based on their own “engagement and loyalty”, rather than by disbursing money from a single pool of all subscription revenue. Scroll does not give subscribers access to partner sites that have a paywall, it only removes ads from the site if the user also pays the publication's subscription fee.

History
Scroll was founded in 2016 by former Chartbeat Chief Executive Tony Haile. Scroll raised US$3 million in its first round of funding in 2016, including investments from The New York Times, Uncork Capital, and Axel Springer SE. By October 2018, Scroll had raised US$10 million in funding. In 2018, Scroll signed its first partner websites, which included The Atlantic, Fusion Media Group, Business Insider, Slate, MSNBC, The Philadelphia Inquirer, and Talking Points Memo. In February 2019, Scroll acquired social media curation app Nuzzel. The same month, Mozilla and Scroll announced partnership to run a "test pilot" together, but did not go into details. Scroll entered beta testing in 2019, and launched to the general public on January 28, 2020.

In March 2020, Mozilla began offering Scroll as part of its "Firefox Better Web" service bundle.

In May 2021, Scroll was acquired by Twitter, with the future of Scroll cited as being uncertain. An email to customers announcing the change said, "Later this year, Scroll will become part of a wider Twitter subscription that will expand on and adapt our services and functionality".

References

Application software
Proprietary cross-platform software
2021 mergers and acquisitions